Missi is a 1976 Indian Malayalam film, directed by Thoppil Bhasi and produced by M. O. Joseph. The film stars Lakshmi, Mohan Sharma, K. P. Ummer, Sudheer, Vidhubala, M G Soman, Sankaradi in the lead roles. The film has musical score by G. Devarajan.

Plot

Cast
Lakshmi
K. P. Ummer
M. G. Soman
Sudheer
Vidhubala
Mohan Sharma
Sam
Sankaradi
Babu Joseph
Janardanan
Vallathol Unnikrishnan

Soundtrack
The music was composed by G. Devarajan and the lyrics were written by Madhu Alappuzha, Mankombu Gopalakrishnan, Bharanikkavu Sivakumar and Bichu Thirumala.

References

External links
 

1976 films
1970s Malayalam-language films
Films directed by Thoppil Bhasi